Weird Owl are a psychedelic rock band from Brooklyn, New York City formed in 2004. Their first recording, Nuclear Psychology, was released in 2007. Their debut studio album, Ever the Silver Cord Be Loosed, was released in 2009 by Tee Pee Records. Their second album, Build Your Beast a Fire, was released in 2011, and received generally positive reviews. Their mini-LP Healing was released in 2013, followed by the album Interstellar Skeletal in 2015.

The band's music has been compared to that of Deep Purple, Hawkwind, Neil Young, Pink Floyd, and Spirit. Weird Owl's discography, alongside being labeled as psychedelic rock, has also been categorized as stoner rock and space rock.

Members
 Trevor Tyrrell – guitar, lead vocals
 Jon Rudd – guitar
 Sean Reynolds – drums
 Kenneth Cook – bass guitar, keyboards, synths, back-up vocals
 John Cassidy – keyboards, synths

Discography
Studio albums
 Ever the Silver Cord Be Loosed (2009)
 Build Your Beast a Fire (2011)
 Healing (2013)
 Interstellar Skeletal (2015)
 Bubblegum Brainwaves (2017)
 Wet Telepathy (2019)

EPs
 Nuclear Psychology (2007)

References

External links
 Weird Owl at AllMusic

Musical groups established in 2004
Musical quintets
Psychedelic rock music groups from New York (state)
Rock music groups from New York (state)